The France national rugby sevens team competes in the World Rugby Sevens Series, Rugby World Cup Sevens, and other international tournaments. France's best finish in the World Series has been finishing in seventh, which they accomplished twice in 2003–04 and 2005–06.

World Rugby Sevens Series

Tournament history

Summer Olympic Games

Rugby World Cup Sevens

Europe Grand Prix Series

France has been successful in the Rugby Europe Sevens Grand Prix Series. They have won the tournament twice, in 2014 and 2015. They have also finished second on six occasions, most recently in 2016, and third once in 2012.

Rugby X Tournament

Team

Current squad

Former squads

Player records
The following shows leading career France players based on performance in the World Rugby Sevens Series. Players in bold are still active.

Honours
World Rugby Sevens Series
 France Sevens 
 Winners: 2005
 Third-place: 2006, 2016, 2022
 Dubai Sevens 
 Runners-up: 2011
 Third-place: 2012
 Cup (fifth place): 2022
 South Africa Sevens 
 Runners-up: 2012
 Third-place: 2015
 Canada Sevens
 Runners-up: 2019
 Hong Kong Sevens 
 Runners-up: 2019
 Third-place: 2022

See also
 France Sevens tournament

References

External links

WorldRugby profile

France national rugby union team
National rugby sevens teams
Rugby sevens in France